Aviva Baumann ( Farber; born July 10, 1984) is an American actress known best for her role as Nicola in the Judd Apatow and Seth Rogen comedy, Superbad; as young Shannon Gibbs, the first wife of Special Agent Leroy Jethro Gibbs, in flashbacks on the US TV drama NCIS; and as Mandy, the much younger girlfriend of Ken Marino on Party Down.

Early and personal life
She is Jewish. She married actor Ken Baumann on June 16, 2012.

Baumann is a member of Giving What We Can, a community of people who have pledged to give at least 10% of their income to effective charities.

Filmography

References

External links
 
 

1984 births
Actresses from New Mexico
American child actresses
American film actresses
American television actresses
Living people
Actors from Santa Fe, New Mexico
20th-century American actresses
21st-century American actresses
Jewish American actresses
21st-century American Jews